Zygocera is a genus of longhorn beetles of the subfamily Lamiinae.

Species 
Zygocera contains the following species:

 Zygocera albostictica (Breuning, 1939)
 Zygocera apicespinosa (Breuning, 1939)
 Zygocera bivittata (Breuning, 1939)
 Zygocera bivittipennis (Breuning, 1968)
 Zygocera freyi (Breuning, 1956)
 Zygocera metallica Westwood, 1863
 Zygocera pentheoides Pascoe, 1859
 Zygocera pruinosa (Boisduval, 1835)

References

Zygocerini